Cheese Nips (originally stylized as "Cheese-Nips") were a small cheese-flavored cracker manufactured by Mondelez International under its brand, Nabisco, they were originally used to compete against Sunshine Biscuit's (now Kellogg's) Cheez-It crackers.

Portion-controlled packages of Cheese Nips were also sold under the name Cheese Nips Thin Crisps 100 Calorie Packs (Thinsations in Canada).

History
Cheese Nips, originally stylized as "Cheese-Nips", were introduced in 1955. After the Kraft merger, they went by "Kraft Cheese Nips." 
In November 2019, there was a recall on Cheese Nips due to a plastic contamination.
As of 2020, Cheese Nips have since been discontinued as said by a Nabisco representative. They are still sold in Canada by a brand named "Christie" as "Ritz Cheese Nibs" as of 2022.

Popular culture 
Cheese Nips is the name of Act 1 Track 8 of the off-Broadway musical Kurt Vonnegut's God Bless You, Mr. Rosewater. In this satire, Sylvia becomes deranged watching her guests prefer Cheese Nips to her other food preparation.

Statista calculates that in 2016, 1.5 million Americans consumed eight or more bags of Cheese Nips.

See also
 Cheese cracker
 Cheez-It

References 

Brand name crackers
Mondelez International brands
Nabisco brands
Products introduced in 1955
Brand name snack foods